was a village located in Kashima District, Ibaraki Prefecture, Japan.

As of 2003, the village had an estimated population of 11,825 and a density of 219.80 persons per km². The total area was 53.80 km².

On October 11, 2005, Asahi, along with the former town of Hokota, and the village of Taiyō (all from Kashima District), was merged to create the city of Hokota.

External links
Hokota Official website 

Dissolved municipalities of Ibaraki Prefecture
Hokota, Ibaraki